Guaiacolsulfonate (also called sulfoguaiacolum) is an aromatic sulfonic acid used in medicine as an expectorant.

See also
 Guaiacol

References

Expectorants
Benzenesulfonic acids
Phenols
Phenol ethers